Viscount  was a Japanese politician, intellectual and author, who lived in the Meiji and Taishō periods. Apart from his activity in the Japanese government, he also wrote several important works on Japan in English. He was portrayed in a negative manner in Ryōtarō Shiba's novel Saka no ue no kumo.

Early life
Suematsu was born in the hamlet of Maeda in Buzen Province, now part of Yukuhashi, Fukuoka Prefecture. He was the fourth son of the village headman (shōya), Suematsu Shichiemon. His name was initially , he later changed it to the shorter Kenchō.

At the age of ten he enrolled in a private school where he pursued studies in Chinese (kangaku 漢学). In 1872, he briefly entered the Tokyo Normal School, but left it soon after. It was around this time that he made the acquaintance of Takahashi Korekiyo.

In 1874, at age 20, Suematsu began working for the Tokyo Nichi Nichi Shimbun newspaper (predecessor to the Mainichi Shinbun), writing editorials under the pen name . During his time working for the newspaper, he was befriended by its editor, Fukuchi Gen'ichirō.

Suematsu at Cambridge
Suematsu arrived in London in 1878 with the Japanese embassy which was dispatched there, and enrolled in Cambridge University in 1881. He graduated with a law degree from Cambridge (St. John's College, Cambridge) in 1884, returning to Japan in 1886.

Political activities
Suematsu was elected to the Diet of Japan in 1890. Suematsu served as Communications Minister (1898) and Home Minister in his father-in-law Itō Hirobumi's fourth cabinet, 1900–01. He had married Itō's second daughter Ikuko in 1889 when he was 35 and she was 22. As they were from clans which had fought in the 1860s (Kokura and Chōshū), he joked about his marriage as "taking a hostage".

Suematsu was influential in the founding of Moji port in 1889, approaching Shibusawa Eiichi for finance. He also worked to improve the moral standards of Japanese theatre and founded a society for drama criticism.

Suematsu was raised to the kazoku peerage in 1895, when he was made a baron (danshaku).

From 1904 to 1905 Suematsu was sent by the Japanese cabinet to Europe to counteract anti-Japanese propaganda of the Yellow Peril variety (e.g. Russian or German circles) and argue Japan's case in the Russo-Japanese War, much as Harvard-educated Kaneko Kentarō was doing at the request of Itō Hirobumi at the same time in the United States. He was promoted to viscount (shishaku) in 1907.

Literary activities
Suematsu was also active as a writer of English works on Japanese subjects. His works include the first English translation of Genji Monogatari (which he wrote while at Cambridge) and several books on aspects of Japanese culture.

 Kenchio Suyematz, trans.  Genji Monogatari : The Most Celebrated of the Classical Japanese Romances. London: Trubner, 1882.
 Baron Suematsu, A Fantasy of Far Japan; or, Summer Dream Dialogues. London: Constable, 1905.
 Kenchio Suyematsu, The Risen Sun.  London: Constable, 1905.

See also
 Kikuchi Dairoku
 Inagaki Manjirō
 Anglo-Japanese relations
 Japanese students in Britain

Notes

References (books and articles)
 Suematsu Kencho: International Envoy to Wartime Europe, Ian Nish in 'On the Periphery of the Russo-Japanese War Part II', STICERD Discussion paper, LSE, No. IS/05/491, May 2005
 Japanese Students at Cambridge University in the Meiji Era, 1868-1912: Pioneers for the Modernization of Japan, by Noboru Koyama, translated by Ian Ruxton, (Lulu, September 2004)
 "Suematsu Kencho, 1855-1920: Statesman, Bureaucrat, Diplomat, Journalist, Poet and Scholar," by Ian Ruxton, Chapter 6, Britain & Japan: Biographical Portraits, Volume 5, edited by Hugh Cortazzi, Global Oriental, 2005, 
 O'Brien, Phillips P. (2004). The Anglo-Japanese Alliance, 1902-1922. (London: RoutledgeCurzon).
 Lister, Ayako Hotta (1995). The Japan-British Exhibition of 1910: Gateway to the Island Empire of the East. (London: Routledge).
 Cobbing, Andrew (1998). The Japanese Discovery of Victorian Britain. (London: Routledge).
 M. Matsumura, Pōtsumasu he no michi: Kōkaron to Yōroppa no Suematsu Kenchō, pub. Hara Shobo, 1987, translated by Ian Ruxton with the English title Baron Suematsu in Europe during the Russo-Japanese War (1904-05): His Battle with Yellow Peril (lulu.com, 2011)  preview 
 M. Mehl (1993). "Suematsu Kenchô in Britain, 1878-1886", Japan Forum, 5.2, 1993:173-193.
 Henitiuk, Valerie L. (2010). A Creditable Performance under the Circumstances? Suematsu Kenchô and the Pre-Waley Tale of Genji. In TTR : traduction, terminologie, redaction, Vol. XXIII, no. 1, p. 41-70.

External links

 National Diet Library Bio and Photo
 Suematsu's memorial stone is at Yukuhashi city, Fukuoka prefecture. He was born there.
 
 
 
  Contains a translation of the first 17 chapters of The Tale of Genji, with an introduction and footnotes, by Suematsu.
 , available here from Google Books.

|-

|-

1855 births
1920 deaths
Alumni of St John's College, Cambridge
19th-century Japanese historians
Japanese diplomats
Japanese writers
English-language writers from Japan
People from Yukuhashi, Fukuoka
Members of the House of Peers (Japan)
Government ministers of Japan
Ministers of Home Affairs of Japan
Japanese expatriates in the United Kingdom
Kazoku
Japanese people of the Russo-Japanese War
People of Meiji-period Japan
Deaths from Spanish flu
Members of the House of Representatives (Empire of Japan)
Politicians from Fukuoka Prefecture
Writers from Fukuoka Prefecture
19th-century Japanese politicians